The Local Government, Planning and Land Act 1980 (1980 c.65) was responsible for the establishment of development corporations, including the London Docklands Development Corporation.

It also created the Public Request to Order Disposal, which can be used by the government to force a local authority to sell derelict land and empty property owned by certain public landlords. The power was renamed the Community Right to Reclaim Land in 2011.

See also 
Direct service organisation

References

External links 
 House of Commons Hansard Debates for 4 May 1990
 Local Government, Planning and Land Act 1980 on the UK Statute Law Database
 Empty Homes Agency guidance on using PRODs

United Kingdom Acts of Parliament 1980
United Kingdom planning law